The 2004 MBNA America 400 "A Salute to Heroes" was the 13th stock car race of the 2004 NASCAR Nextel Cup Series season and the 36th iteration of the event. The race was held on Sunday, June 6, 2004, before a crowd of 140,000 in Dover, Delaware at Dover International Speedway, a 1-mile (1.6 km) permanent oval-shaped racetrack. The race took the scheduled 400 laps to complete. At race's end, Mark Martin of Roush Racing would survive through a wreck-fest to win his 34th career NASCAR Nextel Cup Series win, his first of the season, and would break a 72-race losing streak. To fill out the podium, Tony Stewart of Joe Gibbs Racing and Dale Earnhardt Jr. of Dale Earnhardt, Inc. would finish second and third, respectively.

Background 

Dover International Speedway is an oval race track in Dover, Delaware, United States that has held at least two NASCAR races since it opened in 1969. In addition to NASCAR, the track also hosted USAC and the NTT IndyCar Series. The track features one layout, a 1-mile (1.6 km) concrete oval, with 24° banking in the turns and 9° banking on the straights. The speedway is owned and operated by Dover Motorsports.

The track, nicknamed "The Monster Mile", was built in 1969 by Melvin Joseph of Melvin L. Joseph Construction Company, Inc., with an asphalt surface, but was replaced with concrete in 1995. Six years later in 2001, the track's capacity moved to 135,000 seats, making the track have the largest capacity of sports venue in the mid-Atlantic. In 2002, the name changed to Dover International Speedway from Dover Downs International Speedway after Dover Downs Gaming and Entertainment split, making Dover Motorsports. From 2007 to 2009, the speedway worked on an improvement project called "The Monster Makeover", which expanded facilities at the track and beautified the track. After the 2014 season, the track's capacity was reduced to 95,500 seats.

Entry list 

*Withdrew due to failing inspection.

**Withdrew due to unknown reasons.

Practice 
There were three scheduled practices to occur, with one on Friday and two on Saturday. However, the first practice on Saturday would be canceled to rain, so only two practices were held.

First practice 
The first practice session would occur on Friday, June 4, at 11:05 AM EST and would last for one hour and 55 minutes.

Second and final practice 
The second and final practice session, sometimes referred to as Happy Hour, would occur on Saturday, July 24, at 11:10 AM EST and would last for 45 minutes.

Qualifying 
Qualifying would occur on Friday, June 4, at 2:30 PM EST. Each driver would have two laps to set a fastest time; the fastest of the two would count as their official qualifying lap. Positions 1-38 would be decided on time, while positions 39-43 would be based on provisionals. Four spots are awarded by the use of provisionals based on owner's points. The fifth is awarded to a past champion who has not otherwise qualified for the race. If no past champ needs the provisional, the next team in the owner points will be awarded a provisional.

Two crashes would occur in qualifying. First, Greg Biffle would hit the wall coming out of the second turn on his first lap, causing Biffle to not make a lap and forcing the team to qualify on a provisional. Then, Michael Waltrip would spin and slam the wall on the second lap, causing Waltrip to go to a backup car and start at the rear for the race.

Three drivers would fail to qualify: Hermie Sadler, Todd Bodine, and Larry Gunselman.

Full qualifying results

Race 
Pole sitter Jeremy Mayfield would lead the first lap of the race. The first caution flew on lap 12 of the race when Casey Mears crashed on the frontstretch. The race restarted on lap 19 with Mayfield leading but was soon passed by Brian Vickers. Mayfield would take the lead back on lap 26. On lap 31, the second caution flew for it being the competition caution. Tony Stewart won the race off of pit road but a majority of cars stayed out including Jeff Burton who led them back to green on lap 38. But on the same lap in turn 2, Elliott Sadler got turned by Kurt Busch and Sadler took out Brendan Gaughan in the process bringing out the third caution. The race restarted on lap 45. On lap 49, Tony Stewart took the lead from Jeff Burton. On lap 108, the fourth caution flew for debris. Stewart won the race off of pit road and led the field to the restart on lap 115. On lap 119, Jeremy Mayfield took the lead from Stewart. Stewart would eventually take the lead back 32 laps later. On lap 158, the 5th caution flew when Joe Nemechek crashed on the frontstretch after he got turned by Terry Labonte. Stewart won the race off of pit road again and would lead the field to the restart on lap 165. The 6th caution would fly on lap 222 when Jeff Gordon blew a right front tire and hit the wall in turn 2. Stewart won the race off of pit road again and led the field to the restart on lap 231. The 7th caution would fly on lap 233 for debris. The race got back underway on lap 238. Green flag pitstops began on lap 314. Stewart gave up the lead after holding onto it for 154 laps to pit and gave it to Jimmie Johnson. Johnson would pit and gave the lead to Ryan Newman. On lap 320, Newman attempted to come down pit road but came in too fast and ended up spinning out and hitting the tire barriers which brought out the 8th caution of the race. The caution period went on for another 25 laps while crews were making repairs to the barrier. The race restarted on lap 346 with Jeremy Mayfield as the leader. Mayfield would be quickly be passed by his teammate Kasey Kahne.

Final laps 
On the restart in turn 3, the big one struck taking out 19 cars. It started when Dave Blaney came up infront of Michael Waltrip and got turned by Waltrip and spun in turn 3. This would cause a massive chain reaction crash to occur which also collected Ward Burton, Rusty Wallace, Mark Martin, Scott Riggs, Ryan Newman, Greg Biffle, Jeremy Mayfield, Ricky Rudd, Kevin Harvick, Sterling Marlin, Casey Mears, Jamie McMurray, Jeff Green, Jimmie Johnson, Dale Jarrett, Kurt Busch, and Jeff Burton. The race was red flagged to clean up the mess. The race would eventually restart with 46 laps to go with Kahne leading. With 27 laps to go, the 10th caution flew when Rusty Wallace blew a right front tire and hit the wall. Kahne, looking for his first win in his 13th start, led the field to the restart with 20 laps to go. But during the restart, Casey Mears' car began to lay fluid all on the racetrack. However, no caution was thrown. With 19 laps to go, Kasey Kahne went into turn three with the lead with Mark Martin and Tony Stewart following behind him when Kahne's car snapped around on him when his car got into the oil and the car hit the outside wall. Robbie Gordon, Matt Kenseth, and Brian Vickers also crashed behind Kahne which brought out the 11th and final caution of the race. In a very heartbreaking way to lose the race, Kasey Kahne's day was all over. Kahne said in his interview that it felt like there was something on the racetrack. The race was red flagged again to clean up the oil. The race restarted with 9 laps to go and Mark Martin held onto the lead and won the race. The race would be Martin's first win since the 2002 Coca-Cola Racing Family 600 which snapped a 73-race winless streak. Only 5 cars finished on the lead lap in the race. Tony Stewart, Dale Earnhardt Jr. Jeff Burton and Scott Riggs rounded out the top 5 while Michael Waltrip, Terry Labonte, Jeremy Mayfield, Scott Wimmer, and Kevin Harvick rounded out the top 10.

In an interview 16 years later on the NASCAR Weekly Podcast on YouTube with Youtubers Eric Estepp, Jaret Lundberg (The Iceberg), Darian Gilliam (Black Flags Matter), Matthew (S1apSh0es), and Daniel Baldwin (DannyBTalks), Mark Martin talked about the race when he mentioned Kahne's spin saying that he "never felt nor saw" any oil on the racetrack.

Race results

References 

2004 NASCAR Nextel Cup Series
NASCAR races at Dover Motor Speedway
June 2004 sports events in the United States
2004 in sports in Delaware